Austroliotia densilineata, common name the close-lined austroliotia, is a species of sea snail, a marine gastropod mollusk in the family Liotiidae.

Description
The height of the shell attains 4.5 mm.

Distribution
This marine species occurs off Victoria, South Australia, Western Australia, and Tasmania.

References

 Tate, R. 1899. A revision of the Australian Cyclostrematidae and Liotiidae. Transactions of the Royal Society of South Australia 23(2): 213–229
 Cotton, B.C. 1959. South Australian Mollusca. Archaeogastropoda. Handbook of the Flora and Fauna of South Australia. Adelaide : South Australian Government Printer 449 p
 Jenkins, B.W. 1984. Southern Australian Liotiidae. Australian Shell News 47: 3–5
 Wilson, B. 1993. Australian Marine Shells. Prosobranch Gastropods. Kallaroo, Western Australia : Odyssey Publishing Vol. 1 408 pp.

External links
  Australian Faunal Directory: Austroliotia densilineata
 Austroliotia densilineata from the Atlas of Living Australia

densilineata
Gastropods described in 1899